Nemophas ramosi is a species of beetle in the family Cerambycidae. It was described by Schultze in 1920, originally as a subspecies of Nemophas rosenbergii. It is known from the Philippines.

References

ramosi
Beetles described in 1920